Christian Fundamentalism can refer to:
 A series of essays called The Fundamentals, published from 1910 to 1915
 Christian Fundamentalism (religious movement) based on the viewpoints in these essays
 The Fundamentalist–Modernist Controversy of the 1920s and 1930s within US Presbyterian and other Churches
 Reformed Fundamentalism within Calvinist Protestant groups
 Christian versions of Fundamentalism, in the broader sense of the term
 The Christian right in the US

See also
Conservative Christianity